Sir Edmund Antrobus, 3rd Baronet (1818–1899) was a British politician.

Edmund Antrobus may also refer to:

Sir Edmund Antrobus, 1st Baronet (died 1826) of the Antrobus baronets
Sir Edmund Antrobus, 2nd Baronet (1792–1870) of the Antrobus baronets, High Sheriff of Wiltshire
Sir Edmund Antrobus, 4th Baronet (1848–1915) of the Antrobus baronets

See also
Antrobus (disambiguation)